Connecticut's 10th State Senate district elects one member to the Connecticut State Senate. It consists of the cities of New Haven and West Haven. It is currently represented by Democrat Gary Winfield, who has been serving since 2014.

Recent elections

2020

2018

2016

2014

2014 special

2012

References

10